Reflections in a Mud Puddle was the third solo LP by Dory Previn, released in late 1971. The second side of the original LP was entitled Taps Tremors And Time Steps (One Last Dance for My Father), and was a continuous suite of songs reflecting on her childhood experiences with a mentally ill father and its impact on her adult relationships.

Track listing
Words and music by Dory Previn, fish horns arranged by Dan Morehouse, and strings and horns arranged by Perry Botkin, Jr.

Reflections in a Mud Puddle
"Doppelganger"
"The New Enzyme Detergent Demise of Ali MacGraw"
"The Talkative Woman and the Two Star General"
"The Altruist and the Needy Case"
"Play It Again, Sam"

Taps Tremors and Time Steps (One Last Dance for My Father)
"The Earthquake in Los Angeles (February, 1971)"
"The Final Flight of the Hindenburg (May, 1937)"
"I Dance and Dance and Smile and Smile"
"The Air Crash in New Jersey"
"Aftershock"

Personnel

Musicians
 Dory Previn – main performer, music and lyrics, vocals, and guitar
 Steve Douglas – alto, tenor and soprano saxophone, fish horns, a&r contractor
 Abe Most – alto and soprano saxophone
 John and Tom Bahler, Stan Farber – backing vocals
 Louie Shelton – banjo and guitar
 Joe Osborn, Carol Kaye, Lyle Ritz – bass
 Frank Capp, Paul Humphrey, Earl C. Palmer, Ron Tutt – drums
 Dennis Budimir, David Cohen, William Keene, Don Peake, Thomas Tedesco – guitar
 Thomas Keene – 1st piano, organ, toy piano, Ondioline, honky-tonk piano, and harpsichord
 Perry Botkin, Jr. – 2nd honky-tonk piano
 Mike Lang – 2nd piano
 Gene Cipriano, Ted Nash – saxophone
 Murray Adler, Israel Baker, Harry Bluestone, Joseph DiFiore, Jesse Ehrlich, James Getzoff, Armond and Nathan Kaproff, Raymond Kelley Jr., Lou Klass, William Kurasch, Gareth D. Nuttycombe, Nathan Rass, Sidney Sharp, Jack Shulman, Paul C. Shure, Joseph Stepansky, Gerald Vinci – strings (violin, viola, and cello)
 Richard Nash – trombone
 Dick Hyde – trombone and performer
 Buck Monari, Anthony Terran – trumpet
 Paul Hubinon – trumpet and flugelhorn

Production
 Nikolas Venet – producer
 Buck Herring – sound engineering
 Norman Seeff – photography and art direction
 Robert Harvey – cover painting
 Roger E. Farris – copyist

External links

1971 albums
Dory Previn albums
Albums produced by Nick Venet
United Artists Records albums